The Orutua River is a river of the Gisborne Region of New Zealand's North Island. One of the country's easternmost rivers, it rises in rough hill country to the southwest of East Cape, flowing north to reach the Pacific Ocean to the east of Te Araroa.

See also
List of rivers of New Zealand

References

Rivers of the Gisborne District
Rivers of New Zealand